A number of steamships were named Otto, including -

, 152 GRT
, 102 GRT
, 896 GRT
, 191 GRT
, 202 GRT
, 199 GRT
, 1,343 GRT
, 1,959 GRT
, 181 GRT
, 174 GRT
, 217 GRT

Ship names